Boxing will be competed as one of the seven sports at the 2011 Commonwealth Youth Games in the Isle of Man from September 8 to 12, 2011, in the Royal Hall in the Villa Marina, Douglas. The event is only open to boys. In the Games, the age limit for participating athletes has been set according to the youth category of the International Boxing Association, which is 17–18 years, means athletes born in 1993 or 1994 are only eligible to take part.

Medal summary

Results

Light flyweight

Flyweight

Bantamweight

Light Heavyweight

References

External links

2011 in boxing
2011 Commonwealth Youth Games events